Vochysiaceae is a plant family belonging to the order of Myrtales.

Description
Trees or shrubs with opposite leaves; flowers are zygomorph 1-(3)-5 merous; ovary inferior or superior; one fertile stamen; fruits samara or capsules.

Biogeography
Six of the eight genera are native to the Neotropics.  The genera Erismadelphus and Korupodendron are native to West and Central Africa.

Evolutionary history
The family likely originated in South America. Erismadelphus is thought to have diverged from Erisma approximately 30 million years ago, and traveled to Africa as the result of long-distance dispersal.

Systematics
Vochysiaceae are closest to Myrtaceae. Vochysiaceae consist of 7  genera with 217 species. The family is classified in two tribes:

Tribe Erismeae : one inferior ovary and winged fruits 
 Erisma Rudge (20 species)
 Erismadelphus Mildbr. (2 species)
 Korupodendron Litt & Cheek (1 species)

Tribe Vochysieae: three fused superior ovaries and capsule fruits 
 Callisthene Mart. (10 species)
 Qualea Aubl. (60 species)
 Salvertia A.St.-Hil. (1 species)
 Ruizterania Marc.-Bert. (19 species)
 Vochysia Aubl. (105 species)

The genus Euphronia, previously included in Vochysiaceae, is unrelated and now stands alone in the family Euphroniaceae, more closely related to the family Chrysobalanaceae.

References

 Family of Vochysiaceae link APWebsite. (engl.)
Amy Litt & Dennis W. Stevenson: Floral development and morphology of Vochysiaceae. I. The structure of the gynoecium in American Journal of Botany, 90, 2003, S. 1533-1547: Online.
M. L. Kawasaki: Vochysiaceae, S. 480-487 in Klaus Kubitzki: The Families and Genera of Vascular Plants, Volume 9, Flowering Plants - Eudicots, Springer Berlin, Heidelberg, 2007, .
F. Carnevale Neto et al.: Vochysiaceae: secondary metabolites, ethnopharmacology and pharmacological potential, "Phytochemistry Reviews" (Print), v. 10, p. 413-429, 2011, DOI: 10.1007/s11101-011-9213-5.

 
Myrtales families